Mahmoud Abu-Saud (1911 – April 24, 1993), was an economist, author, religious scholar and activist.  A specialist in central banking, he was instrumental in establishing central banks and currency regulation in a number of countries including Kuwait and Afghanistan. He was a co-founder of the American Muslim Council.

Life
Abu-Saud was born in 1911 in Sudan to Egyptian parents. He later lived in Panama City, Florida. He died of a heart attack on April 24, 1993 in Birmingham while on a speaking tour in England.

Work
Professor Abu Saud was a prominent figure and contributor to the seminars and conferences of the Association of Muslim Social Scientists (AMSS), the International Institute of Islamic Thought and the Islamic Society of North America for several years.

Writings
 Sex Roles in Muslim Families in the USA, privately published, 1979
 Money, Interest and Qirad, Studies in Islamic Economics, Ed. Khurshid Ahmad, The Islamic Foundation, Leicester, 1980, 
 Concept of Islam, American Trust Publications, 1983, 
 Contemporary Economic Issues: Usury and Interest, International Islamic Federation of Student Organizations, Kuwait, 1984
 Contemporary Zakat, Zakat and Research Foundation, Ohio, 1988
 The Methodology of the Islamic Behavioral Sciences, American Journal of Islamic Social Sciences, Vol 10, No 3, Fall 1993, ISSN 0742-6763

References

External links
 The Role Of A Muslim Doctor
 Sex Roles in Muslim Families in the US
 The Methodology of the Islamic Behavioral Sciences.pfd
 The Methodology of the Islamic Behavioral Sciences.html
 

1911 births
1993 deaths
20th-century American economists